Indian Killer is a novel written by Sherman Alexie, featuring a serial killer in the city of Seattle, Washington, who scalps white men. Because of this technique, he is called the "Indian Killer" and rising fear provokes anti-Native American violence and racial hostility.

Plot 
A serial killer terrorizes Seattle, hunting and scalping white men. The crimes of the so-called 'Indian Killer' triggers a wave of violence and racial hatred against the city’s Native American population.

John Smith, born Indian and raised by whites, desperately yearns for his lost heritage and seeks his elusive true identity; he also battles the severe mental illness that has plagued him since childhood. He meets Marie, an Indian activist outraged by people like Jack Wilson, a mystery writer who claims to be part Indian. As bigoted radio personality Truck Schultz incites whites to seek revenge, tensions mount and Smith fights to slake the anger that engulfs him.

Reception
Publishers Weekly wrote, "this novel offers abundant evidence of a most promising talent extending its range." The editorial review on Amazon.com said, "Alexie's new novel is a departure in tone from his lyrical and funny earlier work" and that "Alexie layers the story with complications and ancillary characters".

The New York Times wrote, "It's difficult not to make Indian Killer sound unrelievedly grim. It is leavened repeatedly, however, by flashes of sardonic wit, the humor that Indians use to assuage pain”.

Sherman Alexie has said Indian Killer is "a feel-good novel about interracial murder".

Film version
In the 1990s, Alexie planned to direct a film version of Indian Killer, but the film was never made.

Characters

Major characters 
 John Smith
 Marie Polatkin
 Jack Wilson
 Clarence Mather
 Truck Schultz

Minor characters 
 Reggie Polatkin
 Mark Jones
 The Foreman
 Aaron Rogers
 David Rogers
 Olivia Smith
 Daniel Smith
 Erik Clancy

References

1996 American novels
Novels by Sherman Alexie
Native American novels
Novels set in Seattle
English-language novels
Novels about serial killers